Tiruchirappalli West may refer to:
 Tiruchirappalli West taluk
 Tiruchirappalli West (state assembly constituency)